Beleza Pura is a Brazilian telenovela produced and broadcast by TV Globo. It premiered on 18 February 2008, replacing Sete Pecados, and ended on 12 September 2008, replaced by Três Irmãs.  It is written by the Andrea Maltarolli, with the collaboration of Emanoel Jacobina, Ricardo Hoffstetter, Daisy Chaves, Flávia Bessone, and João Brandão.

It stars Edson Celulari, Regiane Alves, Christiane Torloni, Carolina Ferraz, Humberto Martins, Reginaldo Faria, Zezé Polessa, and Kadu Moliterno.

Cast
 Edson Celulari as Guilherme Medeiros
 Regiane Alves as Drª. Joana da Silva
 Christiane Torloni as Sônia Amarante / Estela Fonseca
 Carolina Ferraz as Norma Gusmão
 Humberto Martins as Dr. Renato Reis
 Werner Schünemann as Tomás Fonseca Guimarães
 Reginaldo Faria as Dr. Olavo Pederneiras / Copacabana
 Zezé Polessa as Ivete dos Santos
 Kadu Moliterno as Dr. Gaspar Saldanha
 Maria Clara Gueiros as Suzy
 Leopoldo Pacheco as Raul
 Ísis Valverde as Rakelli dos Santos
 Marcelo Faria as Robson Pederneiras
 Carol Castro as Sheila Cabral
 Bruno Mazzeo as Dr. José Henrique Soares
 Mônica Martelli as Helena Cister / Mateus Cister
 Rodrigo Veronese as Mateus Cister / Tânia Císter
 Antônio Calloni as Eduardo Passos
 Soraya Ravenle as Débora Brito
 Helena Fernandes as Márcia Passos
 Guilherme Fontes as Alex Brito
 Monique Alfradique as Fernanda Brito
 Bianca Comparato as Luiza Passos
 Paulo Vilela as Anderson dos Santos
 Ana Lima as Regina
 Rodrigo Lopéz as Betão
 Rafael Cardoso as Klaus Amarante
 Gustavo Leão as Felipe Cascudo
 Letícia Isnard as Meu Bem / Valmiréia Assumpção Jensen
 Pedro Brício as Erick Jensen
 Bia Montez as Assumpção
 Elias Andreato as Adamastor
 Hélio Ribeiro as Dr. Ciro Sanches
 Marcella Valente as Bia
 Ernani Moraes as  Milton
 Jairo Mattos as Ivar Jensen
 Adriana Birolli as Viviane
 André Abujamra as Dr. Thiago
 Eduardo Succini as Dr. Sérgio
 Fabiana Valor as Íris
 André Luiz Rocha as Severino
 Luciana Fregolente as Vilma
 Cibele Larrama as Carol
 Aline Borges as Luana
 Jéssica Mancini as Cris
 Simone Pontes as Juracy
 Lucianna Martins as Camila
 Clarissa Freire as Tamires
 Vinícius Soares as Zé
 Mickey Leão as Armandinho
 Sabrina Marques as Tereza
 Poliana Aleixo as  Dominique Amarante
 David Lucas as Hugo Císter

Special guests
 Vanessa Lóes as Eleonora Amarante
 Michel Bercovitch as Celso Torres
 Maria Gladys as Romena
 Duda Ribeiro as Lino
 Jorge Lucas as Leno
 Márcia Cabrita as Gina
 Ellen Rocche as Gleice
 Cláudio Galvan as Jurandir Feitosa
 Luciano Huck as himself
 Elaine Mickely as Miriam
 Christiano Cochrane as Rodrigo
 Gianne Albertoni as Musa do Carcará
 Fernanda Lima as herself
 Ana Maria Braga as herself
 Rita Cadilac as herself
 Luíza Brunet as herself
 Gabriella Vigol as Bebel
 Leonardo Jabbour as Zé Júnior
 Luiz Nicolau as PéasdeasCabra
 Mauricio Marques as Sanguessuga
 Ed Oliveira as Augusto
 Créo Kellab as MC Baratão
 Ricardo Kosovski as Paulo Abreu
 Chico Terrah as Detetive
 Ernesto Piccolo as Eugênio
 Daniel Lobo as Miguel
 Marcelo Assumpção as Ricardo Mendes
 Henrique César as Genealogista
 Jaime Leibovitch as Castro
 Cláudio Caparica as Garçon
 Bruna Pietronave as Alessandra
 Brendha Haddad as Ipanema
 Carla Faour as Rosa
 Adriana Quadros as Nadir
 Sônia de Paula as Castorina
 Rodrigo dos Santos as Orlandino
 Emílio Pitta as Professor Antunes
 Cláudia Borioni as Madame Katina
 Willian Vita as Cicatriz

Soundtrack

National

 Dois Lados - Frejat (Norma's theme)
 Beleza Pura - Skank (opening sequence theme)
 Independente (Ladies Night) - Wanessa Camargo (location theme)
 Vem pra Ficar - Monica Besser (young cast theme)
 Madrugada - João Estrella (location theme)
 Veja Bem, Meu Bem - Ney Matogrosso (Helena's theme)
 Me Deixa em Paz - Seu Jorge & Teresa Cristina (Ivete and Gaspar's theme)
 Tu Sais Je Vais T´aimer (Eu Sei que Vou Te Amar) - Marcio Faraco & Nana Caymmi (Joana and Guilherme's theme)
 Coisas do Coração - José Augusto (Eduardo and Débora's theme)
 Acontece - Jane Duboc (Robson's theme)
 Coração Vagabundo - Ana Cañas (Renato's theme)
 Malemolência - Céu (Felipe's theme)
 Pé de Nabo - Sandra Peres (Joana's theme)
 Argumento - Paulinho da Viola (location theme)
 Esnoba - Banda Moinho (Rakelli and Robson's theme ; Rakelli's theme)

International

 Apologize - Timbaland & OneRepublic (Guilherme's theme)
 I'll Be Waiting - Lenny Kravitz (Joana and Renato's theme)
 Tattoo - Jordin Sparks (location theme)
 With You - Chris Brown (Klaus and Fernanda's theme)
 Love Song - Sara Bareilles (Felipe and Luiza's theme)
 Mercy - Duffy (Raul and Suzy's theme)
 Set Me Free (Unplugged) - House Boulevard (location theme)
 So Small - Carrie Underwood
 Show Me - John Legend (location theme)
 One of Those Nights - Heath Brandon (Sônia and Guilherme's theme)
 Those Dancing Days are Gone - Carla Bruni (location theme)
 What I Miss About You - Katie Melua (Eduardo and Débora's theme)
 Never Meant to Hurt You - Wire Daisies (main love theme)
 Disco Lies - Moby (Norma's theme)
 Set Me Free (Radio Edit) - House Boulevard (general theme)
 Never Can Say Goodbye - Gloria Gaynor (Robson e Rakelli's theme)

External links 
 
 Website

Brazilian telenovelas
TV Globo telenovelas
2008 telenovelas
2008 Brazilian television series debuts
2008 Brazilian television series endings
Portuguese-language telenovelas
Television shows set in Rio de Janeiro (city)
Cross-dressing in television